Blood Music is the second and final studio album by British shoegaze band Chapterhouse. Early copies of this album, as well as North American and Japanese editions, include the bonus remix CD Pentamerous Metamorphosis by Global Communication. Cherry Red re-issued the album in 2008, prefaced by songs from the "Mesmerise" and "We Are The Beautiful" CD singles.

Production
The album has a more pronounced electronic sound than its predecessor.  Many producers contributed to the album.

Critical reception
Ira Robbins, in Trouser Press, wrote: "Another tuneful delight in a different kitchen, Blood Music hustles and bustles, putting emphatic rhythms into songs that could have been cut from the first album’s sparkling pop cloth."

Track listing
 "Don't Look Now" (Andrew Sherriff)
 "There's Still Life" (Simon Rowe)
 "We Are the Beautiful" (Stephen Patman)
 "Summer's Gone" (Rowe, Sherriff)
 "Everytime" (Sherriff)
 "Deli" (Ashley Bates, Simon Rowe)
 "On the Way to Fly" (Patman)
 "She's a Vision" (Patman)
 "Greater Power" (Patman) 
 "Confusion Trip" (Patman)
 "Love Forever" (Rowe, Sherriff)
 "Picnic" (found only on vinyl and Japanese edition)

The US Limited Edition includes a bonus disc containing two remixes of We Are The Beautiful, Frost and Picnic.

References 

Chapterhouse albums
1993 albums
Dedicated Records albums